Florian Maria Georg Christian Graf Henckel von Donnersmarck (born 2 May 1973) is an Academy Award-winning German and Austrian film director. He is best known for writing and directing the 2006 dramatic thriller Das Leben der Anderen (The Lives of Others), the 2010 romantic thriller The Tourist starring Angelina Jolie and Johnny Depp, and the 2018 epic drama Never Look Away.

Early years
Henckel von Donnersmarck was born in 1973 in Cologne, West Germany, into the aristocratic Roman Catholic Henckel von Donnersmarck family. He grew up in New York City, Brussels, Frankfurt, and West Berlin and is fluent in English, German, French, Russian, and Italian.

After graduating at the top of his class from the German section of the European School of Brussels I, he studied Russian literature in St. Petersburg for two years and passed the State Exam for Teachers of Russian as a Foreign Language. He holds a Master of Arts degree in Philosophy, politics and economics at New College, Oxford, and a diploma in Film Directing from the University of Television and Film Munich.

Family

The younger son of Dr. Leo-Ferdinand Graf Henckel von Donnersmarck, a former president of the German division of the Order of Malta, and literary scout Anna Maria von Berg, Henckel von Donnersmarck holds German and Austrian citizenships. His father's only brother, Gregor Henckel Donnersmarck, is the emeritus abbot at Heiligenkreuz Abbey, a Cistercian monastery in the Vienna Woods where Henckel von Donnersmarck spent a month writing the first draft of The Lives of Others (German: Das Leben der Anderen).

Henckel von Donnersmarck is married to Christiane Asschenfeldt, the first International Executive Director of Creative Commons. They have three children and currently live in Los Angeles. He stands 2.05 m (6 ft 9 in) tall.

Career

In 1977 (aged 4 or 5), while living as a child in New York, he saw his first movie at the Museum of Modern Art. He expected to see Doctor Dolittle but was "exposed instead to" the German melodrama Varieté. He cites this experience as the start of his interest in film.

In 1996, he won a directing apprenticeship with Richard Attenborough on In Love and War, and then went to study at the Fiction Directing Class of the Hochschule für Fernsehen und Film München (University of Television and Film Munich), Germany, alma mater of directors as diverse as Wim Wenders, Roland Emmerich and Maren Ade, who was Donnersmarck's classmate. His first short film, Dobermann (which he wrote, produced, directed and edited), broke the school record for the number of awards won by a student production. It became an international festival sensation, and Donnersmarck traveled the festival circuit for over a year.

His first feature film Das Leben der Anderen (The Lives of Others), which Donnersmarck spent three years writing, directing and completing, won the European Film Award for Best Film, Best Actor and Best Screenplay in 2006. Donnersmarck won the Los Angeles Film Critics Association's award for Best Foreign Film, was nominated for the Golden Globe (which went to Clint Eastwood instead), and on 25 February 2007 won the Academy Award for Best International Feature Film. In 2007, Donnersmarck was one of 115 new members to be invited to join AMPAS.

His next film, The Tourist, was released in 2010. Donnersmarck re-wrote, directed and completed his sophomore work in under eleven months, telling Charlie Rose he had wanted a break from writing a dark screenplay about suicide. The Tourist was a thriller starring Angelina Jolie and Johnny Depp, and was nominated for three Golden Globes: Best Musical or Comedy, Depp for Actor Musical or Comedy and Jolie for Actress Musical or Comedy. It also won three Teen Choice Awards nominations (Best Picture, Best Actor, Best Actress) of which it won two. The film opened to middling number, but eventually ended up grossing US$278.3 million at the worldwide box office, prompting The Hollywood Reporter belatedly to proclaim it an "international hit".

In 2019, his third feature film Never Look Away was nominated for the Golden Lion at the 75th Venice International Film Festival, for a Golden Globe by the Hollywood Foreign Press Association and for two Oscars in the Best International Feature Film and Best Cinematography categories at the 91st Academy Awards. This was only the second time in history that a German language film by a German director was nominated for an Oscar in multiple categories, the other film being Wolfgang Petersen's Das Boot 36 years prior. It became one of less than two dozen German language features since the end of World War II to surpass one million dollars at the North American box office. Donnersmarck and Christian Petzold are the only directors to have two films in that list. In most international territories, beginning with the Netherlands, Never Look Away became the most successful German language film since The Lives of Others.

In 2022, he was set to direct the psychological thriller Vent for Alcon Entertainment.

Filmography

Influence
In a 2010 interview with The Guardian, director Howard Davies named Donnersmarck as the artist he most admired.

René Pollesch wrote a play, L'Affaire Martin!, which poked fun at von Donnersmarck. According to Pollesch, the director's parents attended a performance and came backstage to say they liked it.

After meeting him at the Davos World Economic Forum, Jay Nordlinger, writing for National Review, described Donnersmarck as "one of the most impressive people on the planet".

The Europe List, a largest survey on European culture, named Donnersmarck's The Lives of Others second on a list of the best films in European culture, after Roberto Benigni's Life is Beautiful and followed by Jean-Pierre Jeunet's Amélie.

Kyle Smith writing for National Review ranked Donnersmarck's Never Look Away as the No. 1 Best Film of the Decade 2010–2019.

Honours
 Commander of the Bavarian Order of Merit
 Commander of the North Rhine-Westphalian Order of Merit

In 2011, Donnersmarck was honoured by the University of Oxford, his alma mater, as one of its 100 most distinguished members from 10 centuries. The university named 100 streets in Oxford's historical centre after these graduates, with Upper Oxpens Road renamed for Donnersmarck.

Selected awards and nominations
 2020 – Winner – Grand Prix – Belgian Film Critics Association for Never Look Away
 2019 – Winner – Audience Award – Miami Jewish Film Festival for Never Look Away
2019 – Winner – Best Picture – Tournai Ramdam Festival for Never Look Away 
2019 – Winner – Audience Award – Aspen Film 27th Academy Screenings for Never Look Away
2018 – Winner – Audience Award – Leiden Film Festival for Never Look Away
2018 – Winner – Leoncino d'Oro for Best Picture – Venice Film Festival for Never Look Away
2018 – Winner – Young Cinema Award for Best Picture – Venice Film Festival for Never Look Away
2013 – Named Young Global Leader by the Davos World Economic Forum
 2011 – 2 Teen Choice Award wins for The Tourist
 2011 – 3 Teen Choice Award nominations for The Tourist
 2011 – 3 Golden Globe nominations for The Tourist
 2009 – Dante Alighieri Society Gold Medal of Merit
 2008 – 4 BAFTA nominations for The Lives of Others
 2008 – César Award for The Lives of Others
 2007 – Academy Award for The Lives of Others
 2007 – New York Film Critics Circle Award for The Lives of Others
 2006 – 2 European Film Awards for The Lives of Others
 Best Film
 Best Screenplay
 2006 – Deutscher Filmpreis (German Film Award) for The Lives of Others
Best Direction
 Best Screenplay
 2006 – Screenwriter Award within the Cologne Conference
 2003 – Friedrich Wilhelm Murnau Foundation Award for Best Short Film for The Crusader
 2002 – Eastman Award at the Hof International Film Festival for The Crusader (shared with Sebastian Henckel von Donnersmarck)
 2000 – Universal Studios' Shocking Shorts Award for Dobermann
 2000 – Max Ophüls Preis for Dobermann

References

Further reading

A list of publications, including many articles

External links
 
 Biography and Interview  in German Films Quarterly
 photographs of Donnersmarck on official site
 Interview  in indieWIRE
 Interview, by Charlie Rose, aired 2010-12-07, with transcript.
 The Lives Of Others Interview 5 April 2008 at Future Movies

1973 births
Florian
Living people
Alumni of the European Schools
Alumni of New College, Oxford
Best Director German Film Award winners
Directors of Best Foreign Language Film Academy Award winners
Filmmakers who won the Best Foreign Language Film BAFTA Award
European Film Award for Best Screenwriter winners
Film people from Cologne
German Roman Catholics
Members of the Order of Merit of North Rhine-Westphalia
University of Television and Film Munich alumni
World Economic Forum Young Global Leaders